The 2007–08 season will be Ferencvárosi TC's 2nd competitive season, 2nd consecutive season in the Nemzeti Bajnokság II and 108th year in existence as a football club.

Squad

Transfers

Summer

In:

Out:

Source:

Winter

In:

Out:

Source:

Competitions

Overview

Nemzeti Bajnokság II

League table

Results summary

Results by round

Matches

Hungarian Cup

Statistics

Appearances and goals
Last updated on 1 June 2008.

|-
|colspan="14"|Youth players:

|-
|colspan="14"|Out to loan:

|-
|colspan="14"|Players no longer at the club:

|}

Top scorers
Includes all competitive matches. The list is sorted by shirt number when total goals are equal.
Last updated on 1 June 2008

Disciplinary record
Includes all competitive matches. Players with 1 card or more included only.

Last updated on 1 June 2008

Clean sheets
Last updated on 1 June 2008

References

External links
 Official Website
 UEFA
 fixtures and results

2007-08
Hungarian football clubs 2007–08 season